The Goethe Award for Psychoanalytic and Psychodynamic Scholarship is given annually by the Section on Psychoanalytic and Psychodynamic Psychology of the Canadian Psychological Association.  The award is given for the best psychoanalytic book published within the past two years and is juried by a peer review process and awards committee.

History of the award 
In 1930, Freud was awarded the Goethe Prize of the City of Frankfurt for his literary and recognized scientific achievements. The Goethe Award for Psychoanalytic and Psychodynamic Scholarship was named in honour of this event. The Goethe Award was first given by the Section in 2001 and considers any disciplinary or interdisciplinary subject matter in theoretical, clinical, or applied psychodynamic or psychoanalytic psychology and is judged on the basis of providing an outstanding contribution to the field.

Recipients of the award 
 2015 - Patrick Luyten, Handbook of Psychodynamic Approaches  to Psychopathology
 2014 - Philip A. Ringstrom, A Relational Psychoanalytic Approach to Couples Psychotherapy
 2013
 2012 – Jon Mills, Conundrums: A Critique of Contemporary Psychoanalysis
 2011 – Nancy McWilliams, Psychoanalytic Diagnosis, Second Edition: Understanding Personality Structure in the Clinical Process
 2010 – Jeremy Holmes, Exploring In Security: Towards an Attachment-Informed Psychoanalytic Psychotherapy
 2009 – Lori C. Bohm, Rebecca C. Curtis, Brent Willock, Taboo or Not Taboo? Forbidden Thoughts, Forbidden Acts in Psychoanalysis and Psychotherapy
 2008 – Irwin Hirsch, Coasting in the Countertransference: Conflicts of Self-Interest Between Analyst and Patient
 2007 – Francois Ansermet & Pierre Magistretti, Biology of Freedom: Neural Plasticity, Experience, and the Unconscious
 2006 – Linda Hopkins, False Self: The Life of Masud Khan
 2005 – Elizabeth Ann Danto, Freud’s Free Clinics. New York: Columbia University Press
 2004 – Paul Verhaeghe, On Being Normal and Other Disorders: A Manual for Clinical Psychodiagnostics
 2003 – Muriel Dimen, Sexuality, Intimacy, Power
 2002 –  Peter Fonagy, Gyorgy Gergely, ; Elliot L. Jurist & Mary Target, Affect Regulation, Mentalisation and the Development of the Self
 2001 – Charles B. Strozier, Heinz Kohut: The Making of a Psychoanalyst

See also

List of psychology awards

References

External links 
 Goethe Award 
 Canadian Psychological Association

Canadian awards
Awards established in 2011
Psychology awards
Psychoanalysis
Canadian Psychological Association